Jefferson Alves de Campos (born 26 October 1964) more commonly known as Jefferson Campos is a Brazilian politician, lawyer, and pastor. He has spent his political career representing São Paulo, having served as federal deputy representative since 2011.

Personal life
Jefferson Campos was born to Zarias Alves de Campos and Berenice Pereira Gomes de Campos. He was a lawyer prior to entering politics. He is a pastor of the International Church of the Foursquare Gospel church, and a vice-president of the Brazilian division of the Foursquare Church.

Political career
As councilor of Sorocaba Campos was key in passing Law No. 5,921 which allowed for Christian creationism to be included in elementary school's curriculum. In 2007 Camps was one of 57 politicians to be investigated in a scandal for taking bribes from a medical firm. In 2014 the São Paulo court officially acquitted him of taking part in the scandal, although he is still suspected of taking bribes in separate events.

Campos voted in favor of the impeachment against then-president Dilma Rousseff and political reformation. He would later vote in favor of opening a corruption investigation against Rousseff's successor Michel Temer, and also voted in favor of the Brazil labor reform (2017). In 2011 he switched from the PSB to the newly created PSD.

References

1964 births
Living people
People from Ourinhos
Brazilian Pentecostal pastors
Members of the Foursquare Church
Democratic Labour Party (Brazil) politicians
Brazilian Labour Party (current) politicians
Social Democratic Party (Brazil, 2011) politicians
Brazilian Socialist Party politicians
Members of the Chamber of Deputies (Brazil) from São Paulo
Members of the Legislative Assembly of São Paulo
20th-century Brazilian lawyers